Milad Ahmadi (born June 18, 1996 in Tehran) is an Iranian footballer who plays as a midfielder for Iranian club Oghab Tehran in the League 2.

Club career

Club Career Statistics
Last Update: 1 August 2020

References

Living people
1996 births
Association football defenders
Iranian footballers
Esteghlal F.C. players
Naft Tehran F.C. players
Sepidrood Rasht players